Macro Express is a Windows-based application that allows automation of routine functions, such as filling out web forms, opening programs, and performing mouse clicks, by means of a simple, specialized programming language with support for variables, if-then-else logic, loops and other functions.

Features include recording of the user's actions into macros, a visual programming language, sending email, window repositioning and resizing, text file processing, and file manipulation. Macros can be launched via a hotkey, or automatically triggered when a process starts or terminates, when a network connection has been made or released, when a file change occurred in a folder, or based on the contents of the clipboard.

See also
AutoIt
AutoKey (for Linux)
AutoHotkey
Automator (for Macintosh)
Automise
Bookmarklet
iMacros for Firefox
Keyboard Maestro (for Macintosh)
KiXtart

References

External links
Official site

Automation software
Utilities for Windows